The men's doubles tournament at the 1985 Australian Open was held from 25 November through 8 December 1985 on the outdoor grass courts at the Kooyong Stadium in Melbourne, Australia. Paul Annacone and Christo van Rensburg won the title, defeating Mark Edmondson and Kim Warwick in the final.

Seeds

Draw

Finals

Top half

Section 1

Section 2

Bottom half

Section 3

Section 4

External links
 1985 Australian Open – Men's draws and results at the International Tennis Federation

Men's Doubles
Australian Open (tennis) by year – Men's doubles